The Diocese of Victoria is a Latin Church ecclesiastical territory or diocese of the Catholic Church in the Canadian province of British Columbia. Its episcopal see is in Victoria. The diocese encompasses all of Vancouver Island and several nearby British Columbia islands. A suffragan diocese in the ecclesiastical province of the metropolitan Archdiocese of Vancouver, the diocese's cathedral is St. Andrew's Cathedral and its present diocesan bishop is Gary Gordon.

Diocesan Demographics
, the diocese had 94,465 Catholics, 22 diocesan Priests, 15 religious Priests, 1 Deacon. The diocese is also helped by 19 Brothers, and 91 Sisters servicing 30 parishes.

History
The diocese was created on 24 July 1846 as the Diocese of Vancouver Island, one of three dioceses in the Pacific Northwest created out of the Vicariate Apostolic of the Oregon Territory. It was elevated to an archdiocese on 19 June 1903 and renamed Archdiocese of Victoria in 1904. It was then lowered to a diocese in 1908, when the metropolitan see was moved to Vancouver.

The territory included Vancouver Island, the Gulf Islands, New Caledonia (mainland British Columbia), the Queen Charlotte Islands and Alaska. Modeste Demers became the new diocese's first bishop.

Territorial losses

On June 19, 1903, the diocese became an Archdiocese of Victoria. It was returned to the status of a diocese on October 1, 1908, and became a suffragan diocese to the Roman Catholic Archdiocese of Vancouver.

Bishops
The following are the lists of Bishops and their years of service:

Ordinaries
Modeste Demers (1846–1871)
Charles-Jean Seghers (1873–1878), appointed Coadjutor Archbishop of Oregon City, Oregon, USA; returned here in 1884
Jean-Baptiste Brondel (1879–1883)
Charles-Jean Seghers (1884–1886); personal title of Archbishop
Jean-Nicolas Lemmens (1888–1897)
Alexander Christie (1898–1899), appointed Archbishop of Oregon City, Oregon, USA
Bertram Orth (1900–1908)
Alexander MacDonald (1908–1923)
Thomas O'Donnell (1923–1929), appointed Coadjutor Archbishop of Halifax, Nova Scotia
Gerald C. Murray, C.SS.R. (1930–1934), appointed Bishop of Saskatoon, Saskatchewan
John Hugh MacDonald (1934–1936), appointed Coadjutor Archbishop of Edmonton, Alberta
John Christopher Cody (1936–1946), appointed Coadjutor Bishop of London, Ontario
James Michael Hill (1946–1962)
Remi Joseph De Roo (1962–1999)
Raymond Roussin, S.M. (1999–2004), appointed Archbishop of Vancouver, British Columbia
Richard Gagnon (2004–2014), appointed Archbishop of Winnipeg
Gary Gordon (2014–present)

Coadjutor bishops
 John James Jonckau (1883); did not take effect
 Raymond Olir Roussin, S. M. (1998-1999)

Auxiliary bishop
Louis Aloysius Lootens (1876-1898)

Churches

Greater Victoria
St Andrew's Cathedral
Holy Cross
Our Lady of Fatima (Portuguese)
Our Lady of the Rosary
Our Lady Queen Of Peace
Saanich Peninsula Parish
Sacred Heart
St-Jean-Baptiste (French)
St. Joseph the Worker
St. Leopold Mandic (Croatian)
St. Patrick's
St. Rose of Lima
Courtenay
Christ The King
Campbell River
St. Patrick's
Gold River
St. Peter and St. Paul
Hornby Island
Holy Cross

Chemainus
St. Joseph's
Duncan
St. Ann's
 St. Edward the Confessor
Lake Cowichan
St. Louis De Montfort
Ladysmith
St. Mary's
Gabriola Island
Our Lady of Victory Mission
Mayne Island
St. Francis of Assisi
Pender Island
St. Teresa's Chapel
Salt Spring Island
Our Lady of Grace
Mill Bay
St Francis Xavier
Shawnigan Lake
Our Lady Queen of the World

Nanaimo
St. Peter's
Trinity Catholic
Parksville
Church of the Ascension
Port Alberni
Holy Family/Notre Dame
Tofino
St. Francis of Assisi
Ucluelet
Holy Family
Alert Bay
Our Lady of Assumption
Port Hardy
St. Bonaventure
Port McNeill
St. Mary's
Port Alice
St. Theresa's
Sayward
St Bernadette's
Tahsis
St. Joseph's

Monasteries
House of Bread Monastery, a Benedictine monastery in Nanaimo

Education

Catholic high schools

 St. Ann's Academy (Victoria, British Columbia), was open 1858 and closed in 1974.
 Smith Memorial High School, of Port Alberni, was opened 1951 and closed in 1976.

Catholic elementary schools

 St. Ann's Academy for Boys, of Duncan, was erected in 1864 and closed in 1969.
 St. Mary's School, of Ladysmith, was established 1909 and closed in 1913.

Catholic Universities, Colleges and Seminaries
 St. Joseph's School for Nursing, of Victoria, was erected in 1900 and closed in 1981.
 St. John Fisher / Thomas More College 1953 and closed in 1993.

Religious institutes
Religious institutes of women
Benedictine Sisters
Franciscan Poor Clares
Missionary Oblates of Mary Immaculate
Sisters of St. Ann

Residential Schools
The Diocese managed two residential schools in British Columbia. Upon the discovery of the remains of 215 children at Kamloops Indian Residential School, the diocese released a statement of apology and commitment. 

 Kuper Island Indian Residential School
 The Christie Roman Catholic school

Charities
Health Care
 Lourdes Hospital, of Campbell River, was erected in 1926 and closed in 1957.
 St. Joseph's Hospital, of Victoria, was erected in 1876 and closed in 1972.

Notes
 The diocese produces the Diocesan Messenger which is a Catholic newspaper for its community.

References

Bibliography
Sisters of St. Ann's scrapbook
St. Ann's establishments

External links 

Victoria
Organizations based in Victoria, British Columbia